"Lips of Wine" is a song written by Sy Soloway and Shirley Wolfe and performed by Andy Williams.  The song reached #17 on the Billboard chart in 1957. Archie Bleyer's Orchestra played on the song.

References

1957 singles
Andy Williams songs
1957 songs
Cadence Records singles